International Mstislav Rostropovich Festival – a festival organized by Mstislav Rostropovich in 2006, in Baku and dedicated to the 100th anniversary of Dmitri Shostakovich’s birthday was the basis of this festival. The festival dedicated to eminent Baku citizen Msitslav Rostropovich was held in December. Organizers of the festival were the Ministry of Culture and Tourism, the Mstislav Rostropovich Foundation and the Heydar Aliyev Foundation.

References

Culture in Baku
Music festivals in Azerbaijan
Winter events in Azerbaijan